SM North EDSA (formerly SM City North EDSA, The SM Center North EDSA and The SM City North EDSA), and colloquially known as SM North, is a large shopping mall located in Quezon City, Metro Manila, Philippines. It is the first SM Supermall in the country and formerly the largest shopping mall in the Philippines from 2008 to 2011, circa 2014, and from 2015 to 2021.

SM North EDSA is owned and operated by SM Prime Holdings. The mall's redevelopment began with the opening of The Block in July 2006. Among the developments were a new Annex building which opened in December 2008 and Sky Garden which opened in May 2009. The Car Park Plaza was turned into a lifestyle center in 2009.

History
The lot was previously owned by the Government Service Insurance System and originally intended to host houses for public school teachers. The mall opened on November 8, 1985. It was the first mall built by SM Prime Holdings Inc., with the initial tenants being SM's fifth department store and first supermarket.

As more tenants and entertainment venues were added, SM North EDSA then came to be known as the mall that institutionalized the "one-stop" shopping concept in the Philippines. It was the first to introduce "mailing" as a pastime in the Philippines. A four-level carpark, also known as Annex 1, was constructed in February 1988. The lower ground floor was converted into an enclosed retail space. Another level was also added to the main mall. On July 28, 1989, a two-floor annex, also known as the original "Annex 2", was built providing more leasable space, a bowling alley, and four additional movie houses. The main building and the annexes were expanded with a lower ground level, and the first level of The Carpark Plaza was converted into a Cyber zone, a section reserved mainly for technology and gadget retail.

Over the years, SM North EDSA had seen many expansions and redevelopments, including the construction of Annex 3, which opened in 2006. On July 28, 2006, Annex 3, also known as The Block, was opened featuring a hypermarket, its flagship toy store, additional four movie theaters, retail shops, and restaurants. On February 8, 2007, as part of its massive redevelopment plan, the original Annex 2 was completely demolished and construction of a new building started. The current Annex 2 was reopened on December 12, 2008. In May 2009, The Sky Garden was opened to the public, featuring its linear park garden and a 1,500-seater Sky Dome.  In 2011, the six-story structure Annex 4, known as the Northlink, was completed, housing BPO companies and retail stores.

For two years (2014-2016), SM North EDSA was the largest solar-powered shopping mall in Southeast Asia after installing 5,760 solar panels until that record was surpassed in May 2016 by the Robinsons Star mills Pampanga in San Fernando, Pampanga.

SM North EDSA Complex
Since its inception in 1985, and the construction of the original Car Park Plaza in February 1988 and the second Annex Building in July 1989, SM North EDSA Complex's current edifice within the complex are composed of the City Center, Interior Zone (including the Car Park Plaza), The Annex, The Block, The Sky Garden, The Northlink, and The North Towers. The complex has further expanded beyond which is interconnected by a series of footbridges linked to different sides of the main mall structure.

Main mall complex

City Center (Main Building)

Opened on November 8, 1985, the original building consisted of only three floors. Its original structure has evolved through the years. The City Center has a total of 190,000 m2 gross floor area. Its fourth floor has recently been added to keep up with demand. The newly renovated city center has spherical skylights. As the hub of the retail complex, the City Center has various retail establishments, including the mall's main anchors: SM Store (formerly The SM Store, and SM Department Store) and SM Supermarket. It is also the hub of leisure anchors such as SM Food court, an entertainment center, and a newly modernized cineplex that incorporated the country's second IMAX Theater. The main dining establishments of the City Center are situated on the second level where they break through the frontage in a sequence of linear casements which overlook the Sky Garden.

The building had undergone several changes since 2019, with the renovation of the west wing cinema area, conversion of east wing cinemas to tenant spaces, and the construction of a new Go-Kart facility in the portioned area formerly occupied by SM Store at the 3rd Level. The go-kart facility and the new four digital cinemas at the West Wing (replacing Cinemas 9 & 10) opened on May 1 and 4, 2022, respectively. A new facility named Dino Land will open at the former eastern entrance of SM Store.

Interior Zone (Annex 1)
The Car Park Plaza or Annex 1, the first building, was built in February 1988. The original structure was a four-level parking lot. In the early 2000s the open-parking area right beside it were built up and made into its horizontal expansion to accommodate more vehicles and to integrate the newly constructed The Block. In the 2010s the building was expanded vertically by two floors via a steel structure that also integrated rooftop solar panels. The Car Park Plaza features the first outlet of the Cyber zone that was later moved to The Annex building and additional 8,000 parking slots. The building is connected to the main mall with a footbridge located on the second floor.

Today, the former Car Park and Cyber zone have been transformed into a "lifestyle center" named the Interior Zone which opened in July 2009 and planned by Architects EAT from Australia. The 300-meter long "lifestyle center" is a shop for furniture, houseware, décor, upholstery, wallpaper, tiles and lighting fixtures. Also on the Annex 1 is a solar power plant made up of 5,760 solar panels and located on the seventh level. The plant can generate up to 1.5 megawatts of power which makes SM North EDSA the world's largest solar-powered shopping mall for two years until Robinsons Star malls in San Fernando, Pampanga claimed the title in 2016.

The Annex (Annex 2)
The original Annex 2 was built on July 28, 1989 (formerly The SM City Annex). It consisted of three floors as an expansion to the City Center and featured close to 200 shops and restaurants. On top of the four additional movie houses it also catered a bingo hall, an amusement center and a bowling alley. The lower ground floor (or basement) also served as the former administration office of SM North EDSA along with a few beauty clinics and a junior anchor, Hardware Workshop. A footbridge was constructed at the left side of the City Center that provided easy access to the mall. On February 20, 2002, the four movie houses were closed and on February 8, 2007, the original Annex 2 was closed and demolished as part of SM North EDSA Complex's redevelopment plan.

On December 12, 2008, it reopened with high-end retail stores, specialty restaurants, a Cyberzone, a game arcade and a new bowling center. The current Annex 2 measured . Like The Block, The Annex has an exterior with undulating aquamarine ribbon consisting of perforated metal panels. The Annex has a curvilinear atrium, which stretches its length. In June 2009, SM North EDSA reopened its bowling center located on the lower ground floor.

The Block (Annex 3)
The Block, formerly one of the wide-open parking areas to the right of the main building, was opened on July 28, 2006. This  mall has five levels of retail shops and restaurants, five digital cinemas (originally four, which was closed for renovation works in 2020, now reopened with 3 digital + 2 Director's Club on November 24, 2021), and a  SM Hypermarket on the ground level. The Block's architectural design is centered on a large oval courtyard that hosted events and products launches. This is crisscrossed by multiple bridges on several levels and is lit through large circular skylights. The Block contained most of the high-end anchor stores owned or operated by SM which includes but is not limited to H&M, Uniqlo, Forever 21, and Vikings. It is also home to the Our Lady Most Holy Rosary Chapel, a Roman Catholic chapel located at the fourth level.

Several bridge connections integrated The Block to the existing mall, carpark areas, Sky Garden and the North Towers.

The Northlink (Annex 4)
The Northlink (also known as North Link) is the fourth addition to the complex. It is a six-story structure primarily hosting BPO companies, other office tenants and a few retail stores. It is connected to other parts of the wall through Bridgeway's. The Northlink has an open deck at its top which is used for private use of the mall.

The North Towers (Annex 5)
A panoramic building with five cascading towers named the North Towers is located in the former site of the Super Sale Club warehouse beside The Block. The shortest tower facing North Avenue will be the Park Inn by Radisson Blu Hotel North EDSA while the remaining towers will be used as office spaces. The official opening of the mall component named The North Towers Mall happened on December 7, 2018. The building will be done in two phases. The first involves the North Tower Mall and the three front buildings while the second phase involves the completion of the two remaining and tallest buildings.

Sky Garden

The Sky Garden is a long, elevated curvilinear park which opened on May 29, 2009. The Sky Garden's water features include two bubblers, a simulated river flowing at the central part of the park, and waterfalls at the end of the second floor which can also be used as a screen where promotional materials can be projected.

Other features outside the main mall complex

SM Cyber West Avenue
The SM Cyber West Avenue is a 15-level structure that covers more than 42,000 square meters and around 22,700 square meters for office space. The building is linked via Bridgeway to the SM North EDSA Mall Complex as well as the future nearby common station. It is targeted primarily for a business process outsourcing or BPO companies which houses Emerson Electric, Concentrix and Convergys. It sits on a 2,910-square-meter property at the corner of the main EDSA thoroughfare and West Avenue. The remaining leasable area mostly found on the ground and second levels feature a Save More supermarket and other support retail and commercial establishments.

Grass Residences
A 43-floor, three-tower condominium complex, known as the Grass Residences, was developed by SM Development Corporation (SMDC). The Towers 4 (called Wilmington) and 5 (called Berkshire), known as the Fern Residences, opened on the fourth quarter of 2017 and second quarter of 2018, respectively.

Former buildings

Super Sale Club
There was a warehouse building situated on a two-hectare lot within the SM North EDSA Complex that housed the former Super Sale Club. Sometime in 2008, it was leased to its junior anchors, Ace Hardware and Bingo Bonanza, both of which later moved to The Annex when it opened. After that, Kotse Network leased a portion of the warehouse building. Part of the building was converted into a parking lot for valet service until its subsequent demolition to give way for the North Towers.

Gallery

New mall

Old mall

Incidents and accidents

City Center
September 14, 2011: Two persons were shot, Police Officer 2 Jonathan Diva of the Quezon City Police District Station 2 said that initial information on the shooting incident stated that a woman shot two persons past 7:00 PM.
December 15, 2013: A holdup and shootout occurred when the Martilyo Gang, a notorious local criminal group specializing in robbing stores by smashing and stealing valuables using hammers, robbed a jewelry store in The SM Store North EDSA on the first floor.
July 16, 2017: A fire broke out at the department store on Sunday evening around 8:45PM and has already reached the 3rd alarm.

The Annex
April 5, 2018: A customer of the PC Home Service Center at the Cyberzone of the building's fifth floor who wanted to claim his laptop despite not holding a claim stub succumbs to stab wounds on various parts of the body after being stabbed nine times by the suspect who was the store manager and head technician of the said store.

The Block
January 8, 2010: Two men were reportedly injured after a portion of the sunroof of the building was collapsed. One person was brought to the emergency room of the Capitol Medical Center for treatment.
January 16, 2016: An elevator operator died after falling from the fifth floor at around 7:00 am.

See also
 List of largest shopping malls
 List of shopping malls in Metro Manila
 List of shopping malls in the Philippines

Bibliography

References

External links

 
 

Shopping malls established in 1985
SM Prime
Shopping malls in Quezon City
Buildings and structures in Quezon City
1985 establishments in the Philippines